1055 may refer to:

 1055, a number in the 1000s range
 AD 1055 (MLV), a year in the Common Era
 1055 BC, a year Before the Common Era

Roads
 A1055 road (Great Britain)
 Louisiana Highway 1055 in Louisiana, USA
 Farm to Market Road 1055 in Texas, USA

Naval vessels
 , a World War II German U-boat 
 , a U.S. Navy Cold War frigate
 , a World War I U.S. Navy patrol boat

Other uses
 Atari 1055, a floppy drive unit
 1055 Tynka, a main belt asteroid, the 1055th asteroid registered

See also

 MLV (disambiguation)
 105 (disambiguation)